Bytown was an electoral district of the Legislative Assembly of the Parliament of the Province of Canada.  The district represented the town of Bytown, in Canada West, which was re-named Ottawa in 1855. The electoral district was created in 1841, upon the establishment of the Province of Canada, from the merger of Upper Canada and Lower Canada. It was renamed to Ottawa following the renaming of the city. 

Bytown was represented by one member in the Legislative Assembly.  It was abolished in 1867, upon the creation of Canada and the province of Ontario.

Boundaries 

Bytown electoral district was primarily centred on the town of Bytown, Canada West (now Ottawa, Ontario).  It was located on the south shore of the Ottawa River, which was the boundary with Canada East,  now the province of Quebec.

The Union Act, 1840 merged the two provinces of Upper Canada and Lower Canada into the Province of Canada, with a single Parliament.  The separate parliaments of Lower Canada and Upper Canada were abolished.Union Act, 1840, 3 & 4 Vict., c. 35, s. 2.  Prior to the Union, Bytown had been included in the electoral district of the County of Carleton in the Legislative Assembly of Upper Canada, but the Union Act provided that Bytown would constitute a separate electoral district in the Legislative Assembly of the new Parliament.

The Union Act gave the Governor General of the Province of Canada the power to draw the boundaries for the electoral district.  The first Governor General, Lord Sydenham, issued a proclamation shortly after the formation of the Province of Canada in early 1841, establishing the boundaries for the electoral district:

Members of the Legislative Assembly 

Bytown was represented by one member in the Legislative Assembly. The following were the members for Bytown.

Significant elections 

In the first general election of 1841, Lord Sydenham was actively involved.  He took all possible steps to ensure that a majority of the members elected to the Legislative Assembly would be supporters of the union of the Canadas.  During a tour of Canada West, he stopped in Bytown and urged three of the declared candidates for the seat to withdraw in favour of his preferred candidate, Stewart Derbishire, even though Derbishire had no connection to Bytown.  As part of his arguments, Sydenham told them that it was due to his influence that Bytown had received its own seat, separate from Carleton County.  The three candidates withdraw, but a fourth, William Stewart continued in his candidacy.  When the vote was held in March, 1841, Derbishire was elected, by a vote of 52 to 29. Stewart issued two public protests, accusing the returning officer of partisanship, but did not formally contest the result.

Abolition 

The district was abolished on July 1, 1867, when the British North America Act, 1867 came into force, creating Canada and splitting the Province of Canada into Quebec and Ontario.  It was succeeded by electoral districts of the same name in the House of Commons of Canada and the Legislative Assembly of Ontario.

References 

Electoral districts of Canada West
Electoral districts of Ottawa